The qualification matches for Group 1 of the European zone (UEFA) of the 1994 FIFA World Cup qualification tournament took place between August 1992 and November 1993. The teams competed on a home-and-away basis with the winner and runner-up claiming 2 of the 12 spots in the final tournament allocated to the European zone. The group consisted of Estonia, Italy, Malta, Portugal, Scotland, and Switzerland.

Standings

Results

Goalscorers

6 goals

 Stéphane Chapuisat

5 goals

 Roberto Baggio
 Adrian Knup

4 goals

 Georges Bregy

3 goals

 Dino Baggio
 Roberto Mancini
 Giuseppe Signori
 Jorge Cadete
 Ally McCoist
 Pat Nevin
 Christophe Ohrel

2 goals

 Pierluigi Casiraghi
 Stefano Eranio
 Rui Águas
 Rui Barros
 Rui Costa
 Paulo Futre
 João Pinto
 John Collins
 Kevin Gallacher
 Ciriaco Sforza

1 goal

 Sergei Bragin
 Roberto Donadoni
 Paolo Maldini
 Gianluca Vialli
 Pietro Vierchowod
 Carmel Busuttil
 Martin Gregory
 Kristian Laferla
 Fernando Couto
 António Folha
 António Nogueira
 Oceano
 José Orlando Semedo
 Scott Booth
 Colin Hendry
 Brian McClair
 Billy McKinlay
 Thomas Bickel
 Marc Hottiger
 Kubilay Türkyilmaz

Notes

External links
Group 1 Detailed Results at RSSSF

1
1992–93 in Scottish football
1993–94 in Scottish football
1992–93 in Italian football
Qual
1992–93 in Portuguese football
1993–94 in Portuguese football
1992–93 in Swiss football
Qual
1992–93 in Maltese football
1993–94 in Maltese football
1992 in Estonian football
1993 in Estonian football